The Congregation of Saint Thérèse of Lisieux  is the first religious brothers congregation founded in the Syro-Malabar Church in India and the first congregation in the name of St. Thérèse of Lisieux in India. The congregation also has a priestly wing.

It was founded on 19 March 1931 in a small village called Mookkannur by  Mar Augustine Kandathil; later the Archbishop augmented the congregation with a priestly wing in 1945. 

They are engaged in catechetical works, orphanages, schools, industrial training centres (ITC), hospitals, production centers, library, youth centres, prison ministry etc. Balanagar ITC, Mookkannur, is one of the most famous industrial training centres run by them.

Further reading

History of the congregation
George Thalian: , Mar Louis Memorial Press, 1961. (Postscript) (PDF).
Founder
Balanagar Technical Institute Association
Archdiocese of Ernakulam

Catholic orders and societies
Catholic teaching orders
Christian organizations established in 1931
Syro-Malabar Catholic Church
Discalced Carmelite Order